32nd edition of the tournament after 2012-2013 season, after the split of the Kuwaiti Premier League, which Burgan SC debuts in the tournament.

Teams

Lists of teams and locations

Personnel and sponsorship

Table

Play-Off
In this Seasons Play-Off match to determine who's the 8th team of the 2018–19 Kuwaiti Premier League,
Is between Al-Jahra SC and Al-Fahaheel FC

References

External links
Kuwait League Fixtures and Results at FIFA
Kuwaiti Premier League (Arabic)
xscores.com Kuwait Premier League
goalzz.com - Kuwaiti League
RSSSF.com - Kuwait - List of Champions

Kuwaiti Division One seasons
Premier League
Kuwaiti Kuwaiti Division One